Evgenia (Zenia) Tsima (born May 17, 1986 in Devin, Bulgaria) is a female former Greek professional volleyball player who was a member of the Greece women's national volleyball team. In Summer 2017 she withdrew for family reasons.

Sporting achievements

European Honours
CEV Women's Challenge Cup
  Runner-up: 2017 with Olympiacos S.F. Piraeus

National championships
 2016/2017  Hellenic Championship, with Olympiacos S.F. Piraeus

National cups
 2016/2017  Hellenic Cup, with Olympiacos S.F. Piraeus

References

External links
 profile at greekvolley.gr 
 profile at CEV web site at cev.eu
 Zenia Tsima in Olympiacos www.olympiacossfp.gr (Olympiacos official website) 
 Olympiacos Women's Volleyball team roster at CEV web site

Panathinaikos Women's Volleyball players
Olympiacos Women's Volleyball players
Greek women's volleyball players
1986 births
Living people
21st-century Greek women